.bh is the Internet country code top-level domain (ccTLD) for Bahrain. It is administered by the Telecommunications Regulatory Authority of Bahrain (TRA).

History

The .bh domain was first delegated in 1994 to the University of Bahrain Computer Center. In 1999, the domain was delegated to the Bahrain Telecommunications Company, which since remains the sponsoring organisation.

In 2002, the Telecommunications Regulatory Authority was established, and in 2008, the Minister of Telecommunications of Bahrain assigned TRA as the governmental agency responsible for the management of the .bh top-level domain.

On 6 December 2011, the Telecommunication Regulatory Authority commenced a request to ICANN for redelegation of the “.BH” top-level domain. In March 2012, this request was completed.

Structure
Registration directly at second level is available internationally, while all registrations under the second level domain names listed below, require a local presence and relevant local licences.

References

External links
 IANA .bh whois information
 Telecommunications Regulatory Authority of Bahrain

Telecommunications in Bahrain
Internet in Bahrain
Country code top-level domains
Computer-related introductions in 1994

sv:Toppdomän#B